The 305mm/45 Modèle 1906 gun was a heavy naval gun of the French Navy.

An improved version, the 305mm/45 Modèle 1910 gun, was installed on the Courbet class. Six surplus guns were modified to become railway guns and designated Canon de 305 modèle 1906/10 à glissement at the end of World War I, and, although too late to see action in that war, they were used during the Second World War.

See also

Weapons of comparable role, performance and era
 BL 12 inch Mk X naval gun Vickers (British) equivalent
 12"/45 caliber Mark 5 gun US equivalent

Notes

Bibliography

External links 

 PIECES LOURDES : 240 et plus
 305 mm/45 (12") Model 1906 and Model 1906-1910

 

Naval guns of France
World War II naval weapons
305 mm artillery